John George Murray (15 July 1927 — 1988) is an English former footballer who played as a left back.

Career
Murray began his senior career with Chelmsford City in 1948. In 1949, Murray joined Leyton Orient. After failing to make an appearance for the club, Murray signed for Sittingbourne. In 1951, Murray signed for Gillingham, making four Football League appearances for the club in the 1951–52 Third Division South. After leaving Gillingham, Murray joined Betteshanger Colliery Welfare.

Personal life
He died in Fulham in 1988.

References

1927 births
1988 deaths
Association football defenders
English footballers
Footballers from Lambeth
Chelmsford City F.C. players
Leyton Orient F.C. players
Sittingbourne F.C. players
Gillingham F.C. players
Betteshanger Colliery Welfare F.C. players
English Football League players